Bréhima Traoré (born 23 August 1973) is a Malian footballer. He played in 27 matches for the Mali national football team from 1994 to 2004. He was also named in Mali's squad for the 1994 African Cup of Nations tournament.

References

External links
 

1973 births
Living people
Malian footballers
Mali international footballers
1994 African Cup of Nations players
Place of birth missing (living people)
Association football midfielders
21st-century Malian people